Gymnoganascus is a genus of ant-like leaf beetles in the family Aderidae. There is one described species in Gymnoganascus, G. stephani. The distribution range of Gymnoganascus stephani includes the Caribbean, Central America, and North America.

References

Further reading

 
 
 
 
 

Aderidae